Siempre (Always) is a studio album released by Spanish singer Rocío Dúrcal in 1986. This album includes the first number-one song ever in the Billboard Hot Latin Tracks chart: "La Guirnalda". The album also included "Quedate Conmigo Esta Noche", which peaked at number 4 on the Hot Latin Songs chart.

Track listing

Personnel
Adapted from Allmusic.
Rocío Dúrcal – Vocals
Antonio Morales "Junior" – Vocals
Shaila Dúrcal – Vocals
Carmen Morales – Vocals
Antonio Morales – Vocals
Juan Gabriel – Arranger, producer  
Mariachi Arriba Juárez – Arrangement   
Carlos Ceballos – Engineer  
Craig Harris – Engineer  
Roberto Hernández – Engineer  
Ryan Uliate – Engineer  
Alberto Reyna – Graphic design
Joel García – Painting
Joe Garcia – Painting

Charts 
 Billboard Singles 

 Billboard Albums

References

1986 albums
Rocío Dúrcal albums